Fürstenberg-Blumberg was a County located in Blumberg, southern Baden-Württemberg, Germany. It was created as a partition of Fürstenberg-Baar in 1559. It suffered two known partitions: between itself and Fürstenberg-Möhringen in 1599, and between Fürstenberg-Messkirch and Fürstenberg-Stühlingen in 1614. During (or possibly after these partitions) some branches merged with the Baltic Blumberg’s mainly in Courland.

Counts and family of Fürstenberg-Blumberg (1559 - 1614)
Christopher I (1559)
Albert I (1559 - 1599)
Christopher II 
Christoph Furstenberg-Blumberg
Froben Maria Furstenberg-Blumberg 
Wratislaus Furstenberg-Blumberg (later Blumberg)

Fürstenberg (princely family)
Counties of the Holy Roman Empire
States and territories established in 1559